Pankararú (Pancaré, Pankaré, Pancaru, Pankaruru, Pankarará, Pankaravu, Pankaroru, Pankarú, Brancararu) is an extinct language of eastern Brazil. There are 6,000 ethnic Pankararú, but they all speak Portuguese. In 1961, only two elders could remember anything of the language. Today, they live in Brejo dos Padres and other villages of Tacaratu, Pernambuco State. The language was originally spoken between the Moxotó River and the Pajeú River.

In the 19th century the people split into two ethnic groups, the Pankararú and the Pankararé. One quarter of the Parkararé retain their traditional religion.  Their language, however, is unattested, and can only be assumed to be a dialect of Pankararu.

Classification 
Pankararú has no proven relatives and remains unclassified. There are similarities with Tukano and Tupian. Meader (1976) found that of 80 known lexical items, one third (26) are clearly cognate with Tupian languages. He speculates that the last speakers of Pankararú may therefore have been bilingual in Tupi. The identity of the rest of the vocabulary has not been identified, and Pankararú may be a language isolate.

The Atikum language was spoken nearby, but it is a language isolate and is not related to Pankararú.

Loukotka (1968) also lists these languages as being formerly spoken in Tacaratu, Pernambuco State. It is not known whether or not they were related to Pankararú:
Jeriticó or Jiripancó – village of Pindaé near Brejo dos Padres in Tacaratu, Pernambuco. Survivors now speak only Portuguese.
Macarú – village of Brejo dos Padres, Tacaratu. A few survivors now speak only Portuguese.

Koiupanká and Karuazu may have been related.

Kalankó (Cacalancó), with descendants now living in Água Branca, Alagoas, may have also been related to Pankararú.

Vocabulary

Loukotka (1968)
Loukotka (1968) lists the following basic vocabulary items.

{| class="wikitable"
! gloss !! Pankarurú
|-
| man || porkiá
|-
| sun || panyé
|-
| earth || zyobazyí
|-
| tobacco || azyó
|}

Pompeu (1958)
Language variety from Pompeu (1958), originally collected by Carlos Estêvam:

{| class="wikitable sortable"
! Portuguese gloss (original) !! English gloss (translated) !! "Brejo dos Padres"
|-
| fogo || fire || obaí
|-
| água || water || jinikací; jatateruá; jai, já
|-
| brejo || swamp || ibiji, arôto
|-
| lagoa || pond || joo
|-
| terra || earth || jobají
|-
| pedra || stone || tóitú; ipá
|-
| sal || salt || tuká
|-
| cachimbo || smoking pipe || kuna kuní
|-
| cachimbo cerimonial || ceremonial pipe || matrinadô; matrigó
|-
| maracá || maraca || káma, kabá eyá
|-
| pinheiro || pine || burúti
|-
| menino || boy || jorã, óibo
|-
| parente || relative || gôyáji
|-
| irmã e prima || sister and cousin || dakatái
|-
| onça preta || black jaguar || tupé
|-
| maracajá || margay || Gwariatã
|-
| porco || pig || tarací
|-
| mocó || rock cavy (Kerodon rupestris) || kewí
|-
| tatu-peba || six-banded armadillo (Euphractus sexcinctus) || kuriépe
|-
| boi || ox || kanarí
|-
| vaca || cow || tú
|-
| ovelha || sheep || pusharé; sumui íra
|-
| passarinho || small bird || iushií
|-
| pena || feather || tik
|-
| ovo || egg || aji
|-
| papagaio || parrot || umaiatá
|-
| periquito || parakeet || glyglilin
|-
| peixe || fish || kamijo
|-
| abelha || bee || axxaó
|-
| madeira, pau || wood, tree || dáka
|-
| flor || flower || barkíra
|-
| milho || corn || ta, mõni
|-
| tabaco, fumo || tobacco, smoke || põi; ajó
|-
| bonito || beautiful || limin
|}

Meader (1978)
Below is a 1961 word list of Pankarú (Pankararú) recorded in Brejo dos Padres by Wilbur Pickering from his informant João Moreno. The list is published in Meader (1978).

{| class="wikitable sortable"
! Portuguese gloss (original) !! English gloss (translated) !! Pankarú (Pankararú)
|-
| amarelo || yellow || ˈžúbʌ̀
|-
| pedra amarela || yellow stone || itapurʌŋga
|-
| boca || mouth || ūːřú kàˈtiŋ̄
|-
| minha boca || my mouth || sε̄ ūˈřú
|-
| bom || good || kátù
|-
| ele é bom || He is good. || ayε katu
|-
| o olho é bom || The eye is good. || sảːkàtú kyả̀
|-
| vocês são bons || You (plural) are good. || pε̄ñékātù / pε̃ñékátù
|-
| branco || white || ˈtíŋgʌ́
|-
| buraco || hole || kwàřà
|-
| cabeça || head || uukà
|-
| a cabeça é redonda || The head is round. || muukὶ(ː)
|-
| cabelo || hair || uŋkyò
|-
| o cabelo é preto || The hair is black. || uŋkyò àlóːkià
|-
| cachorro || dog || ítōˈlókyà
|-
| caminho || road || pε
|-
| carne || meat || sóːō
|-
| casa || house || ókhà
|-
| céu || sky || tšιakι / aʌ̨nsε
|-
| cobra || snake || fítš̭ˈàká / fítš̭iākà
|-
| coração || heart || (úpíˈá) ūpia kàtú asu
|-
| corda || rope || ˈmúsúřʌ̨̀nʌ̨̀
|-
| dedo grande || big finger || kų̀ʌ̨́ kàtέ gàsú
|-
| dente || tooth || (tʌ̨̄ˈíŋkàtī)
|-
| dia || day || ˈářà
|-
| ele / ela || he / she || àyέ
|-
| eles, elas || they || āìˈtá
|-
| este, esta || this || kwa
|-
| eu || I || šεʔ
|-
| faca || knife || kisε
|-
| fogo || fire || ˈpo
|-
| fumo (tabaco) || smoke (tobacco) || pɔi
|-
| pedra furada || pierced stone || ítákwàřà
|-
| ele furou a orelha || He pierced his ear. || oː màlί ásò
|-
| homem || man || aba
|-
| homem velho || old man || ábá ùmʌ̨̀
|-
| joelho || knee || àˈlų́
|-
| o joelho está mau || The knee is bad. || sātkālί ˈʔų́ː
|-
| língua || tongue || (mε̄āŋˈgā)
|-
| lua || moon || ˈžasì
|-
| lua cheia || full moon || kaiřε
|-
| lua nova || new moon || katiti
|-
| mãe || mother || sέʔžàʔ
|-
| mandioca || cassava || mʌ̨̀nˈdī
|-
| mão || hand || pɔ̄pitέkàí
|-
| mar || sea || pəřəˈnà
|-
| mau || bad || pùší
|-
| menina || girl || mítákų̄įˈʌ̨̀ / íādε̄doŋ̄kīˈà
|-
| menino || boy || íādε̄dùˈà
|-
| milho || maize || ávātì
|-
| moça || girl || kų̀įʌ̨̀ mùkú
|-
| moça velha || older girl || kų̀įʌ̨̀ fìlìwà
|-
| mulher || woman || kų̀įʌ̨̄
|-
| não || no || ų́hų̄
|-
| nariz || nose || tákwí
|-
| meu nariz || my nose || séˈtį̀
|-
| nossos narizes (meu e seu) || our noses (inclusive) || iānέʔtį̀
|-
| seu nariz (de você) || your nose || šέˈtį́
|-
| seu nariz (dele) || his nose || sέˈtį́ àyὲ
|-
| noite || night || pīˈtų̀
|-
| nós, nosso || we, our || ìànέʔ
|-
| olho (pavεořukya) || eye || (pavεořukya) / sả̀ː
|-
| onça || jaguar || žáˈgwà
|-
| orelha || ear || mōːkìhkyà
|-
| pai (meu pai) || father (my father) || sέʔpāià
|-
| pedra || stone || ítà
|-
| pedra branca || white stone || itatiŋga
|-
| pedra preta || black stone || ítáʔų̀na
|-
| perna || leg || kóškì
|-
| preto || black || ʔų́nʌ̨̄
|-
| redondo || round || púʌ̨̄
|-
| sol || sun || kwářásí
|-
| velho || old || ùmʌ̨̄
|-
| homem velho || old man || ábá úmʌ̨̀
|-
| moça velha || older girl || kų̀iʌ̨̀ fìlìwà
|-
| vós (vocês) || you || pὲˈñε̄
|-
| açúcar || sugar || dódəsākà
|-
| cabra || goat || kářkíá
|-
| camaleão || chameleon || fìˈkíˈá
|-
| canela || cinnamon || (kālε̄ˈʔί̨ʌ) kia
|-
| coxo || lame || kóš
|-
| dedo || finger || kų̄nˈkàtέ
|-
| farinha || flour || kítshià
|-
| feijão || bean || nátsākā
|-
| garganta || throat || gāε̄òˈŋkyà
|-
| grosso || thick || sábóó
|-
| lagarto || lizard || šōá
|-
| macaxeira || cassava || aipį́
|-
| moreno || dark-skinned || pìˈtùnà
|-
| queixo || chin || tʔíŋkwˈí
|-
| sim || yes || ʌ̨̅hʌ̨́
|-
| ? || ? || (pʌ̨̅ŋkārὲː)
|}

References

 Fabre, Alain (2005): Diccionario etnolingüístico y guía bibliográfica de los pueblos indígenas sudamericanos: PANKARARU / PANKARARÉ
 Meader, Robert E. (1976): Índios do Nordeste: Levantamento sobre os Remanescentes Tribais do Nordeste Brasileiro

Language isolates of South America
Unclassified languages of South America
Extinct languages of South America
Unattested languages of South America
Indigenous languages of Northeastern Brazil